The Butcher's Boy is 1982 book by Thomas Perry.  The suspense novel won the 1983 Edgar Award for Best First Mystery Novel (American).  The book has been reprinted several times and was followed by three more novels in the "Butcher's Boy" series: Sleeping Dogs (1992), The Informant (2011), and Eddie's Boy (2020).

Plot
The Butcher's Boy, not to be confused with Michael Robb's "The Butcher's Boy - The Ballad of Billy Badass," features a professional hitman (whose real name is not given but who uses the alias Michael Schaeffer in sequels) as its protagonist.  Murder is a craft for the "Butcher's Boy," a reference to his foster father, "Eddie the Butcher," who raised him to follow in both of his two trades: the cold-blooded killer with a gimlet eye, and an actual butcher for a cover life. When Eddie dies an unnatural death, his adoptive son continues in his footsteps, but leaves the butcher shop behind.  After dispatching an innocent union member and a U.S. Senator, he arrives in Las Vegas, Nevada to pick up his fee. Instead of a payoff he finds himself on the wrong end of a murder contract. His reputation as a non pareil professional killer has always ensured he would be paid, even by men who think no more about murder than scratching an itch, men who nonetheless would not risk creating such an adept enemy. The story brings that scenario to life as the Butcher's Boy seeks to collect the debt by terrorizing the Mafia—lifelong source of his freelance jobs and current nemesis—into backing off.

Meanwhile, the initial hits completed by "The Butcher's Boy" have attracted the attention of U.S. government specialists on organized crime.  Elizabeth Waring, a bright young, unmarried analyst in the Justice Department, begins to see a pattern in the killings. As the violence escalates around the United States, her colleagues and superiors suspect internecine warfare among the bad guys, though Waring deduces the fact that one man on a mission may be the key. As she works her way closer to his identity, she and the reader come to admire his audacity and remorseless, creative efficiency in staying one step ahead of the Mob's death sentence.

The point of view switches back and forth between Waring and the killer, whom readers come to root for as the ultimate David to the Goliath of organized crime. Readers are drawn into rooting for the Butcher's Boy to succeed in evading both his Mafia pursuers and the government agents. And indeed, he does, only to find himself in similar circumstances one, and then two, decades later in Sleeping Dogs and The Informant, where both he and Waring have also aged historically, and share the knowledge and context of the earlier stories. Together the trilogy makes for a brilliant virtuoso fugue on the concepts of predator/prey, the affinity between detectives and killers, and the greater morality of what a true survivalist might be like, at the top of his game.

Perry has gone on to a prize-filled career as a consummate crime writer with a score of eclectic novels, another irresistible, unique protagonist named Jane Whitefield (novel series), and the reputation as a "capo di tutti capi" of crime writers.

Publication information
 Perry, Thomas.  The Butcher's Boy.  Scribner, 1982.   (USA edition)

References

1982 American novels
American crime novels
1982 debut novels